Minuscule 6 (in the Gregory-Aland numbering), δ 356 (Soden). It is a Greek minuscule manuscript of the New Testament, on 235 parchment leaves, dated palaeographically to the 13th century. The manuscript has complex contents and full marginalia. It was adapted for liturgical use.

Description 

The codex contains entire of the New Testament except the Book of Revelation (Catholic epistles placed before Pauline epistles) with some lacunae. The text is written in one column per page, 29-47 lines per page. It is written in elegant small letters.

The text of Gospels is also divided according to the smaller Ammonian Sections (Matthew 356, Mark 234 – the last section in 16:9, Luke 342, John 226).

At the end it has liturgy of Chrysostomos.

The order of books is usual: Gospels, Book of Acts, Catholic epistles, Pauline epistles.

At the end of the Second Epistle to Timothy it has subscription Τιμοθεον Β' απο Ρωμης, the same subscription have manuscripts P, 1739, 1881.

Text 

The Greek text of Catholic epistles and Pauline epistles of this codex is a representative of the Alexandrian text-type, with numerous alien readings. Aland placed it in Category III. This text belongs to the textual Family 1739. In rest of books of New Testament (Gospels and Acts) it is a representative of the Byzantine text-type, it close to the codex 4. Aland placed it in Category V.

According to the Claremont Profile Method it belongs to the textual group Π6 – along with Codex Petropolitanus – in Luke 1, Luke 10, and Luke 20.

Noteworthy readings:

 Romans 3:12 omit ουκ εστιν — B, 6, 424**, 1739
 1 Corinthians 1:14 omit τω θεω — א* B, 6, 424**, 1739
 1 Corinthians 7:5 it reads τη προσευχη (prayer) along with 𝔓11, 𝔓46, א*, A, B, C, D, F, G, P, Ψ, 33, 81, 104, 181, 629, 630, 1739, 1877, 1881, 1962, it vg, cop, arm, eth. Other manuscripts read τη νηστεια και τη προσευχη (fasting and prayer) or τη προσευχη και νηστεια (prayer and fasting).
 Galatians 1:15 omit και καλεσας δια της χαριτος αυτου — P46, 6, 424**, 1739, 1881
 Ephesians 1:1 omit εν εφεσω — P46, B, 6, 424**, 1739
 Ephesians 4:28 omit ταις (ιδιαις) χερσιν — P, 6, 424**, 1739, 1881
 Ephesians 5:31 omit και προσκολληθησεται προς την γυναικα αυτου — 6, 1739*, Origen, Jerome
 1 Timothy 3:14 omit προς σε (εν) — (F, G), 6, 263, 424**, 1739, 1881
 2 Timothy 4:8 omit πασσι — D**, 6, 424**, (1739), 1881, lat Ambrosiaster
 Hebrews 5:12 omit τινα — Uncial 075, 6, 424**, 1739, 1881
 Jude 12 it reads ευωχιαις, majority read αγαπαις – majority.

History 

The manuscript once belonged to Fontainebleau. It was used by Robert Estienne in his Editio Regia, and designated by him as ε'. It was examined by Wettstein, Griesbach, and Scholz (only Matthew, Mark 1-4, John 7), and C. R. Gregory (in 1885). It was examined and described by Paulin Martin. Gregory saw the manuscript in 1885.

Wettstein gave the number 6 to it. This number is still in use.

It was cited in 27 edition of Nestle-Aland Novum Testamentum Graece only twice (1 Cor 11:24; 15:6).

The codex is currently located at the Bibliothèque nationale de France (Gr. 112) in Paris.

See also 
 List of New Testament minuscules
 Textus Receptus
 Textual criticism

References

Further reading 

 J. Neville Birdsall, A Study of Manuscript 1739 and its Relationship to MSS. 6, 424, 1908, and M, (unpublished Ph.D. dissertation, 1959).

External links 

 Minuscule 6 at the Encyclopedia of Textual Criticism

Greek New Testament minuscules
13th-century biblical manuscripts
Bibliothèque nationale de France collections